Larry Tucker (June 23, 1934 – April 1, 2001) was an American film and television writer, producer, and occasional actor, who wrote the comedy Bob & Carol & Ted & Alice (1969) with Paul Mazursky. Tucker and Mazursky were nominated for the Academy Award for Best Original Screenplay for their work on Bob & Carol & Ted & Alice.

Biography
Tucker was from Philadelphia and began his career with humorist Mort Sahl at San Francisco's Hungry i club. After the Hungry i, Tucker became a television writer, working on The Danny Kaye Show. Tucker acted in the films Blast of Silence (1961), Advise and Consent (1962), Shock Corridor (1963) and Angels Hard as They Come (1971).

Tucker and Mazursky were also responsible for the development and production of The Monkees eponymous television series and the 1968 romantic comedy I Love You, Alice B. Toklas!, which starred Peter Sellers. In the early 1980s Tucker was executive producer and one of the writers of the sitcom Jennifer Slept Here (1983), Mr. Merlin (1981–82), Teachers Only (1982–83) and Stir Crazy (1985).

Tucker died of complications from multiple sclerosis and cancer in 2001.

Filmography

Actor

References

External links

Film producers from Pennsylvania
American male film actors
Television producers from Pennsylvania
American male screenwriters
American television writers
Deaths from cancer in California
Neurological disease deaths in California
Deaths from multiple sclerosis
Writers from Philadelphia
1934 births
2001 deaths
American male television writers
Screenwriters from Pennsylvania
20th-century American male actors
20th-century American male writers
20th-century American screenwriters